Heye Town is a rural town in Shuangfeng County, Hunan Province, People's Republic of China. The town is bordered to the north by Jingzi Town, to the northeast by Shigu Town of Xiangtan County, to the southeast by Xinqiao Town of Hengshan County, to the west by Shiniu Township, and to the south by Xijiang Township of Hengyang County.

History
On 14 October 2016, the town was listed among the first group of "Distinctive Towns in China" by the National Development and Reform Commission, Ministry of Finance and Ministry of Housing and Urban-Rural Development.

Administrative division
The town is divided into 63 villages and 1 community, the following areas: Hejia'ao Community, Shaxi Village, Fengtian Village, Mupi Village, Shipai Village, Zhumu Village, Shiyu Village, Jinyu Village, Longyin Village, Fengming Village, Shenchong Village, Niyu Village, Dasheng Village, Xinmin Village, Qiaojia Village, Tianping Village, Guihua Village, Hetang Village, Jianshe Village, Hengmu Village, Haiqiu Village, Xingqiu Village, Shuangjiang Village, Qingquan Village, Youshui Village, Lianmeng Village, Fengshi Village, Hongri Village, Yongzhen Village, Haosheng Village, Shuanghe Village, Futuo Village, Shilin Village, Xinyao Village, Hecun Village, Tangjia Village, Xingao Village, Shangxin Village, Taiyuan Village, Dangxian Village, Jinfeng Village, Xiashi Village, Baini Village, Jianshi Village, Daping Village, Jiangbian Village, Jiufeng Village, Liangjiang Village, Lianshi Village, Huabei Village, Shihu Village, Nitang Village, Shiyuan Village, Hanpo Village, Xiangxing Village, Xiao Village, Xinjian Village, Yijiaping Village, Heye Village, Yuefei Village, Zhengjiang Village, and Huangteng Village.

Transportation
Provincial Highway S314 passes across the town north to southeast.

Attractions
Former Residence of Zeng Guofan is a famous scenic spot in China.

Notable people

 Jiang Wan, politician.
 Zeng Guofan, politician. 
 Qiu Jin, revolutionist. 
 Tang Qunying, revolutionist. 
 Ge Jianhao, scientist. 
 Xiang Jingyu, revolutionist.
 Wang Caozhi, revolutionist.

References

External links
 

Divisions of Shuangfeng County